Yara is a Japanese surname from Okinawa that may refer to
, Japanese martial artist
, Japanese politician
, Japanese comedian
, Japanese actor

Japanese-language surnames
Okinawan surnames